Luca Filippi (born 9 August 1985 in Savigliano, Italy) is an Italian auto racing driver. He competed in GP2 Series from 2006 to 2012, and the IndyCar Series from 2013 to 2016. In 2008 he was the official Honda Racing F1 test driver.

Career

Formula Renault
Filippi made the step out of karting in 2003, competing in Formula Renault 2.0 Italia, where he finished third in 2004 behind Pastor Maldonado and Kohei Hirate.

Formula 3000
Filippi stepped up to the Italian Formula 3000 series in 2005, driving for Giancarlo Fisichella's Fisichella Motorsport team. He also made his Formula One test debut in 2005 with Minardi in the team's last test.

GP2 Series
Fisichella joined forces with the Coloni Motorsport GP2 Series team in 2006, and Filippi was selected as a driver for the team. However, he switched to the BCN Competición team mid-way through the season.

In 2007, he continued in GP2 with Super Nova Racing and emerged as one of the series' top performers, finishing the season in fourth position.

On 14 November 2007 Filippi tested for Honda Racing F1. On 6 December Filippi tested for Super Aguri F1, being even faster than regular race driver Takuma Sato.

For the inaugural GP2 Asia Series season in early 2008, Filippi raced for Team Meritus, a Malaysian team who entered the series due to regular series team Racing Engineering not competing in the winter series. He only managed to score four points in ten races, finishing in 17th place.

Filippi drove for the ART Grand Prix team in the first half of the 2008 GP2 Series season, alongside Romain Grosjean. Following a disappointing first half of the season, Luca left the team in favour of Sakon Yamamoto after ten races. Filippi was confirmed as a driver at the Arden International team two days later, where he replaced Yelmer Buurman. His results failed to improve and he finished nineteenth in the championship.

Filippi returned to BCN Competición for the 2008–09 GP2 Asia Series season, but was replaced by Fabrizio Crestani as a result of the team's purchase after the first round of the season.

For the 2009 GP2 Series season, he returned to the Super Nova team, and took the final win of the season at the Autódromo Internacional do Algarve. His result promoted him up to fifth overall in the championship standings.

Filippi returned to Team Meritus for the 2009–10 GP2 Asia Series season, and finished as runner-up in the championship standings, taking Meritus' first victory in the series in Bahrain.

Filippi began the 2010 GP2 Series season without a drive, but returned to Super Nova mid-season to replace the injured Josef Král. He took five points from ten races, before Král returned for the season finale, finishing twentieth in the championship. During this period, Filippi became the most experienced GP2 driver in the series' history, beating Javier Villa's record of 82 race entries.

Filippi was drafted into the Scuderia Coloni team for the second round of the 2011 GP2 Asia Series season after regular driver James Jakes opted to move to the United States in order to pursue a career in the IndyCar Series. He returned once again to Super Nova for the main series, alongside Fairuz Fauzy. After five rounds of the championship, he switched back to Coloni, replacing Kevin Ceccon. He immediately registered an improvement in form, winning his first race for the team at the Nürburgring, which also marked his 100th race in the series. He also won the Spa-Francorchamps sprint race and the Monza feature race, propelling him to a career-best second place in the drivers' championship.

After almost a year away from GP2, Filippi was again called up by Coloni as a replacement for Stefano Coletti for his home race of the 2012 championship at Monza. Despite his absence from the series, he won the feature race. He also secured pole position for the following (and final) round of the championship in Singapore, but crashed heavily during the feature race, damaging his car beyond immediate repair and thus non-starting the sprint race. Nevertheless, he still finished 16th in the drivers' championship despite contesting only four of the series' 24 races.

Auto GP
Filippi contested in the 2010 Auto GP season, where he finished 5th in the drivers' standings with 2 victories topping and tailing the season with the 1st race at Brno and the last race at Monza. He returned to the series the following year, taking one pole position, three fastest laps, one win and five further podiums, finishing as runner-up to Kevin Ceccon by only 3 points despite having missed two races.

IndyCar
On 6 March 2012, it was announced that Filippi would join Rahal Letterman Lanigan Racing in the IndyCar series from the Indy 500 onwards. He would have partnered ex-Formula 1 driver Takuma Sato; despite this, he did not take part in the Indy 500 nor in the following races. He competed in four races in 2013  for Bryan Herta Autosport, scoring a best finish of 15th.

CFH Racing signed Filippi for the 2015 IndyCar season to compete at the road/street races.

For the 2016 season, Filippi signed with Dale Coyne Racing to compete in the whole season, ovals included. His first race on an oval track was in Phoenix Arizona, where he finished P20. A few days before the GP of Indianapolis, Coyne excluded Filippi from both Indy events and signed Gabby Chaves in place of the Italian driver.

Formula E

2017 saw Filippi join Nio in the all-electric FIA Formula E Championship alongside Oliver Turvey, where he picked up a point in his debut race with a tenth place finish in the 2017 Hong Kong ePrix. Despite a strong debut, Filippi failed to pick up another point during the season. He missed the Paris ePrix, so that Ma Qinghua could fulfil a contract deal. He scored just one point to Turvey's 46 and was dropped by NIO for the 2018/19 season.

Racing record

Career summary

† As Filippi was a guest driver, he was ineligible for points.
* Season still in progress.

Complete GP2 Series results
(key) (Races in bold indicate pole position) (Races in italics indicate fastest lap)
{| class="wikitable" style="text-align:center; font-size:90%"
! Year
! Entrant
! 1
! 2
! 3
! 4
! 5
! 6
! 7
! 8
! 9
! 10
! 11
! 12
! 13
! 14
! 15
! 16
! 17
! 18
! 19
! 20
! 21
! 22
! 23
! 24
! DC
! Points
|-
|rowspan=3| 2006
! FMS International
|style="background:#EFCFFF;"| VALFEA
|style="background:#EFCFFF;"| VALSPR
|style="background:#CFCFFF;"| IMOFEA
|style="background:#DFFFDF;"| IMOSPR
|
|
|
|
|
|
|
|
|
|
|
|
|
|
|
|
|
|
|
|
!rowspan=3| 19th
!rowspan=3| 7
|-
! Petrol Ofisi FMS International
|
|
|
|
|style="background:#EFCFFF;"| NÜRFEA
|style="background:#EFCFFF;"| NÜRSPR
| CATFEA
| CATSPR
| MONFEA
|
|
|
|
|
|
|
|
|
|
|
|
|
|
|
|-
! BCN Competición
|
|
|
|
|
|
|
|
|
|style="background:#EFCFFF;"| SILFEA
|style="background:#CFCFFF;"| SILSPR
|style="background:#EFCFFF;"| MAGFEA
|style="background:#EFCFFF;"| MAGSPR
|style="background:#CFCFFF;"| HOCFEA
|style="background:#CFCFFF;"| HOCSPR
|style="background:#CFCFFF;"| HUNFEA
|style="background:#EFCFFF;"| HUNSPR
|style="background:#CFCFFF;"| ISTFEA
|style="background:#EFCFFF;"| ISTSPR
|style="background:#DFFFDF;"| MNZFEA
|style="background:#CFCFFF;"| MNZSPR
|
|
|
|-
| 2007
! Super Nova International
|style="background:#FBFFBF;"| BHRFEA
|style="background:#FFDF9F;"| BHRSPR
|style="background:#EFCFFF;"| CATFEA
|style="background:#CFCFFF;"| CATSPR
|style="background:#DFFFDF;"| MONFEA
|style="background:#DFFFDF;"| MAGFEA
|style="background:#DFDFDF;"| MAGSPR
|style="background:#DFFFDF;"| SILFEA
|style="background:#CFCFFF;"| SILSPR
|style="background:#EFCFFF;"| NÜRFEA
|style="background:#EFCFFF;"| NÜRSPR
|style="background:#EFCFFF;"| HUNFEA
|style="background:#CFCFFF;"| HUNSPR
|style="background:#EFCFFF;"| ISTFEA
|style="background:#CFCFFF;"| ISTSPR
|style="background:#DFDFDF;"| MNZFEA
|style="background:#DFDFDF;"| MNZSPR
|style="background:#DFDFDF;"| SPAFEA
|style="background:#CFCFFF;"| SPASPR
|style="background:#CFCFFF;"| VALFEA
|style="background:#DFFFDF;"| VALSPR
|
|
|
! 4th
! 59
|-
|rowspan=2| 2008
! ART Grand Prix
|style="background:#CFCFFF;"| CATFEA
|style="background:#EFCFFF;"| CATSPR
|style="background:#CFCFFF;"| ISTFEA
|style="background:#CFCFFF;"| ISTSPR
|style="background:#EFCFFF;"| MONFEA
|style="background:#CFCFFF;"| MONSPR
|style="background:#CFCFFF;"| MAGFEA
|style="background:#FFDF9F;"| MAGSPR
|style="background:#DFFFDF;"| SILFEA
|style="background:#EFCFFF;"| SILSPR
|
|
|
|
|
|
|
|
|
|
|
|
|
|
!rowspan=2| 19th
!rowspan=2| 6
|-
! Arden International
|
|
|
|
|
|
|
|
|
|
|style="background:#EFCFFF;"| HOCFEA
|style="background:#EFCFFF;"| HOCSPR
|style="background:#CFCFFF;"| HUNFEA
|style="background:#CFCFFF;"| HUNSPR
|style="background:#DFFFDF;"| VALFEA
|style="background:#CFCFFF;"| VALSPR
|style="background:#CFCFFF;"| SPAFEA
|style="background:#EFCFFF;"| SPASPR
|style="background:#EFCFFF;"| MNZFEA
|style="background:#EFCFFF;"| MNZSPR
|
|
|
|
|-
| 2009
! Super Nova Racing
|style="background:#DFFFDF;"| CATFEA
|style="background:#CFCFFF;"| CATSPR
|style="background:#EFCFFF;"| MONFEA
|style="background:#CFCFFF;"| MONSPR
|style="background:#DFDFDF;"| ISTFEA
|style="background:#EFCFFF;"| ISTSPR
|style="background:#CFCFFF;"| SILFEA
|style="background:#CFCFFF;"| SILSPR
|style="background:#EFCFFF;"| NÜRFEA
|style="background:#CFCFFF;"| NÜRSPR
|style="background:#DFFFDF;"| HUNFEA
|style="background:#DFDFDF;"| HUNSPR
|style="background:#DFFFDF;"| VALFEA
|style="background:#EFCFFF;"| VALSPR
|style="background:#EFCFFF;"| SPAFEA
|style="background:#EFCFFF;"| SPASPR
|style="background:#EFCFFF;"| MNZFEA
|style="background:#EFCFFF;"| MNZSPR
|style="background:#DFDFDF;"| PORFEA
|style="background:#FBFFBF;"| PORSPR
|
|
|
|
! 5th
! 40
|-
| 2010
! Super Nova Racing
| CATFEA
| CATSPR
| MONFEA
| MONSPR
| ISTFEA
| ISTSPR
| VALFEA
| VALSPR
|style="background:#CFCFFF;"| SILFEA
|style="background:#CFCFFF;"| SILSPR
|style="background:#CFCFFF;"| HOCFEA
|style="background:#CFCFFF;"| HOCSPR
|style="background:#CFCFFF;"| HUNFEA
|style="background:#DFFFDF;"| HUNSPR
|style="background:#DFFFDF;"| SPAFEA
|style="background:#EFCFFF;"| SPASPR
|style="background:#EFCFFF;"| MNZFEA
|style="background:#CFCFFF;"| MNZSPR
| YMCFEA
| YMCSPR
|
|
|
|
! 20th
! 5
|-
|rowspan=2| 2011
! Super Nova Racing
|style="background:#EFCFFF;"| ISTFEA
|style="background:#CFCFFF;"| ISTSPR
|style="background:#EFCFFF;"| CATFEA
|style="background:#EFCFFF;"| CATSPR
|style="background:#FFDF9F;"| MONFEA
|style="background:#DFFFDF;"| MONSPR
|style="background:#EFCFFF;"| VALFEA
|style="background:#CFCFFF;"| VALSPR
|style="background:#CFCFFF;"| SILFEA
|style="background:#CFCFFF;"| SILSPR
|
|
|
|
|
|
|
|
|
|
|
|
|
|
| rowspan="2" style="background:#DFDFDF;"| 2nd
| rowspan="2" style="background:#DFDFDF;"|  54
|-
! Scuderia Coloni
|
|
|
|
|
|
|
|
|
|
|style="background:#FBFFBF;"|NÜRFEA
|style="background:#FFDF9F;"|NÜRSPR
|style="background:#DFFFDF;"|HUNFEA
|style="background:#EFCFFF;"|HUNSPR
|style="background:#DFFFDF;"|SPAFEA
|style="background:#FBFFBF;"|SPASPR
|style="background:#FBFFBF;"|MNZFEA
|style="background:#DFFFDF;"|MNZSPR
|
|
|
|
|
|
|-
| 2012
! Scuderia Coloni
|SEPFEA
|SEPSPR
|BHR1FEA
|BHR1SPR
|BHR2FEA
|BHR2SPR
|CATFEA
|CATSPR
|MONFEA
|MONSPR
|VALFEA
|VALSPR
|SILFEA
|SILSPR
|HOCFEA
|HOCSPR
|HUNFEA|HUNSPR
|SPAFEA
|SPASPR
|style="background:#FBFFBF;"| MNZFEA
|style="background:#CFCFFF;"| MNZSPR
|style="background:#EFCFFF;"| MRNFEA
|style="background:#FFFFFF;"| MRNSPR
! 16th
! 29
|}

Complete GP2 Asia Series results
(key) (Races in bold indicate pole position) (Races in italics indicate fastest lap)

Complete Auto GP results
(key) (Races in bold indicate pole position) (Races in italics indicate fastest lap)

IndyCar Series results
(key) (Races in bold indicate pole position) (Races in italics indicate fastest lap)

Complete Formula E results
(key) (Races in bold indicate pole position; races in italics indicate fastest lap)

Complete TCR Europe Touring Car Series results
(key) (Races in bold indicate pole position) (Races in italics indicate fastest lap)

† Driver did not finish the race, but was classified as he completed over 90% of the race distance. 

Complete World Touring Car Cup results
(key) (Races in bold indicate pole position) (Races in italics'' indicate fastest lap)
 
‡ As Filippi was a Wildcard entry, he was ineligible to score points.

References

External links

 
 

1985 births
Living people
People from Savigliano
Italian racing drivers
Karting World Championship drivers
Italian Formula Three Championship drivers
British Formula Renault 2.0 drivers
Italian Formula Renault 2.0 drivers
Formula Renault Eurocup drivers
Auto GP drivers
GP2 Asia Series drivers
GP2 Series drivers
International GT Open drivers
IndyCar Series drivers
Formula E drivers
World Touring Car Cup drivers
Euronova Racing drivers
Scuderia Coloni drivers
Ocean Racing Technology drivers
Super Nova Racing drivers
ART Grand Prix drivers
Arden International drivers
Team Meritus drivers
Rahal Letterman Lanigan Racing drivers
Ed Carpenter Racing drivers
Dale Coyne Racing drivers
NIO 333 FE Team drivers
Sportspeople from the Province of Cuneo
Blancpain Endurance Series drivers
Team Lazarus drivers
Bryan Herta Autosport drivers
Fortec Motorsport drivers
TCR Europe Touring Car Series drivers